Poropuntius scapanognathus is a species of ray-finned fish in the genus Poropuntius from the basin of the Salween in Thailand and Myanmar.

References 

scapanognathus
Fish described in 1998